Richard Vaughn Chinnick (born August 15, 1953) is a Canadian retired ice hockey Right Wing. He played 4 games for the Minnesota North Stars of the National Hockey League between 1973 and 1975 but spent most of his career, which lasted from 1973 to 1981, in the minor leagues.

Career statistics

Regular season and playoffs

External links
 

1953 births
Living people
Canadian ice hockey forwards
Ice hockey people from Ontario
Minnesota North Stars draft picks
Minnesota North Stars players
New England Whalers draft picks
New Haven Nighthawks players
Peterborough Petes (ice hockey) players
Saginaw Gears players
Sportspeople from Chatham-Kent